Best in Show may refer to:

 Best in Show (film), a 2000 film written and directed by Christopher Guest
 Best in Show (Grinspoon album), 2005
 Best in Show (Jackyl album), 2012
 The Best in Show award (BIS), or the Best in Show competition, in conformation dog shows and Concours d'Elegance
 Best in Show winners of Crufts
 Best in Show winners of the Westminster Kennel Club Dog Show
 Best in Show winners of the Pebble Beach Concours d'Elegance
 Best In Show (horse) – 1982 Kentucky Broodmare of the Year, dam of multiple stakes winners and stakes producers